Smart House is a 1999 Disney Channel Original Movie (DCOM) about a teenage computer nerd and contest whiz (Ryan Merriman), his widowed father, and his little sister, who win a computerized house that begins to take on a life of its own – in the form of an overbearing mother (Katey Sagal).

Plot
After the death of his mother, 13-year-old Benjamin "Ben" Cooper takes it upon himself to take care of his single father Nick and little sister Angie in Hyattsville, Maryland. Ben enters a contest to win a smart house. The family wins and moves into the house (run by a virtual assistant named PAT, short for "Personal Applied Technology") and is introduced to its creator, Sara Barnes.

Nick and Sara begin dating, which upsets Ben, who has not moved on from the death of his mother. Ben decides to reprogram PAT to serve as a maternal figure, hoping his father will realize that the family does not need Sara to replace his mother. Ben presents PAT with numerous 1950s-era TV shows and films from which he hopes she will learn to emulate motherhood using her learning capabilities.

Ben and Angie have a party while Nick and Sara are on a date. With PAT's help, Ben wins over his crush Gwen Patroni, and his bully Ryan is confronted by PAT, who electrically shocks Ryan, haunts him with ghostly skull holograms and chases him out of the house. PAT helps them clean up to cover up evidence of the party, but Nick figures it out anyway, and reprimands Ben and Angie when he finds Gwen's sweater (thrown about during a dance line) in the living room fern. Nick chastises PAT for throwing a party behind his back, asking her to be more responsible with his children.

Using Nick's request for stricter caregiving, PAT seeks out additional reference material with that as a theme, causing her "mother" personality to become more strict and overbearing. Sara shuts down the entire system and joins the family for dinner, but upon hearing Nick offhandedly suggesting she's not needed, PAT overrides the system shutdown and brings herself back online. An angry and jealous PAT generates herself as a holographic housewife, styled like the sitcom housewives Ben taught her to behave like. She kicks Sara out, seeing her as a threat to PAT's place in the family, and locks the Coopers in the house, asserting that the outside world is too dangerous.

Sara manages to make contact with Ben and sneaks into the house, but she becomes trapped with the Cooper family. Ben is able to end the lock-down by telling PAT that she isn't real and will never be human and thus not able to care for him and his sister as a real mother could. PAT finally unlocks the doors and windows, freeing them, and shuts herself down. Sara is able to restore PAT's original personality, but PAT retains some mischievousness. Sara and Nick start dating, and Nick spends more time with his family. Ben finally accepts Sara after realizing she was never trying to replace his mother, and, with PAT's help, he's able to learn how to play basketball.

Cast
 Ryan Merriman as Ben Cooper
 Kevin Kilner as Nick Cooper
 Katie Volding as Angelina "Angie" Cooper
 Jessica Steen as Sara Barnes
 Katey Sagal as PAT, The Smart House
 Paul Linke as Tuttle
 Raquel Beaudene as Gwen Patroni
 Joshua Boyd as Ryan
 William Higdon as Otis Jr.
 Emilio Borelli as Miles
 Jason Lansing as Johnny

Production
The film was based on a screenplay by Stu Krieger and was directed by LeVar Burton. Krieger visited the NASA Jet Propulsion Laboratory to research the technology featured in Smart House and his other film, Zenon: Girl of the 21st Century. Krieger was cognizant that the futuristic technology featured in the film did not seem too far-fetched or unrealistic, saying "I just looked at where we’d been, where we were, and imagined where we were probably headed.”

In 2019, Burton called the film a clear precursor to the widespread use of artificial intelligence and virtual assistant technology, saying "our homes are becoming more and more technologically sophisticated. And that after all, that was what Pat was all about."

Reception
In December 2015, Ariana Bacle of Entertainment Weekly ranked Smart House at number one on a list of the top 30 Disney Channel Original Movies. Bacle wrote, "What earns the movie this top spot on the list is its combination of sob-worthy emotion—that scene where Ben (Ryan Merriman) revisits home videos of his late mom continues to be one of the most moving moments to air on the Disney Channel—and light-hearted glee. ... Plus, Katey Sagal's turn as the good-gone-evil-gone-good resident hologram is nothing short of iconic." An updated list by the same publication that now included the top 33 Disney Channel Original Movies once again awarded Smart House the number one position.

In May 2016, Aubrey Page of Collider ranked each Disney Channel Original Movie released up to that point. Page ranked Smart House at number three, writing, "Arguably the most iconic of the entire DCOM catalog, Smart House is the unlikely futuristic family drama nobody knew we needed. [...] Smart House is the Disney Channel Original Movie perfected."

References

External links

 
 
 

1999 comedy-drama films
1999 television films
1999 films
American comedy-drama television films
American children's comedy films
Disney Channel Original Movie films
Films about artificial intelligence
Films directed by LeVar Burton
Films set in Maryland
Films shot in Los Angeles
American teen comedy films
American science fiction comedy-drama films
Films about families
Films scored by Barry Goldberg
1990s American films
1990s English-language films